Ranavalona is the name of three 19th century queens of the Merina Kingdom in Madagascar:

 Ranavalona I (ruled 1828–1861) notable for attempting to preserve traditional ways against the growing European influence and for major persecution of Christians.
 Ranavalona II (ruled 1868–1883) notable for adopting Christianity as state religion
 Ranavalona III (ruled 1883–1897) the last monarch of the Merina, deposed during French colonial conquest